Warul Kawa Indigenous Protected Area (also known as Deliverance Island) is a small island that is part of Australia's National Reserve System, located  south of Papua New Guinea and about  north of Thursday Island, Torres Strait.

Geology
It is a sand cay surrounded by a shallow reef platform interspersed with sandy patches, with little live coral present.

Brown and green algae are predominating on the rocky substrate with some seagrass present. The island and surrounding reef support two internationally significant populations of sea turtles. It contains one of the largest rookeries for the Flatback turtle (Natator depressus). The extensive shallow water habitats in the area also support large numbers of migrating green turtles. The breeding assemblages in north and eastern Australia are the largest remaining rookeries for green turtles. The island and surrounding reef system have retained their high natural value due largely to their remoteness. Although Warul Kawa has been inhabited periodically by Europeans in the past, there has been little impact on the natural environment as evident by the presence of only two-recorded exotic plant species. The area has maintained high vegetation integrity of considerable diversity and complexity. These habitats support thirty-three species of birds, including the yellow-footed scrubfowl, not reported on many other islands in Torres Strait.

Cultural significance
Due to the spiritual and cultural significance that the island has for local Indigenous people, Deliverance Island was declared an Indigenous Protected Area (IPA) in February 2001. The local Indigenous name for the island, Warul Kawa, means "Island of turtles" in the Torres Strait Island language.

Somerset Maugham's character German Harry from his book Cosmopolitans, a Danish mariner from Langebæk who was in fact known as Old Harry but christened as Johannes Henrik Enevoldsen (22 August 1850 – 21 January 1928), lived on the island as a hermit from about 1888 until his death.

See also

 Indigenous Protected Areas
 List of Torres Strait Islands

References

External links

Significant agreement/treaty
 Warul Kawa (Deliverance Island) Financial Assistance Agreement
 Warul Kawa Indigenous Protected Area (2001 - ) 

Indigenous Protected Areas of Australia
Torres Strait Islands
Protected areas of Queensland
Protected areas established in 2001
2001 establishments in Australia